Ettimadai is a railway station in the Coimbatore suburb of Ettimadai, Tamil Nadu, India. Trains from Coimbatore Junction railway station and Podanur Junction railway station heading to Palakkad Junction railway station passes through this station. It serves primarily for commutators of Amrita Vishwa Vidyapeetham university campus.

References

Southern Railway zone
Railway stations in Coimbatore